Carolesia  blakei is a species of sea snail, a marine gastropod mollusk in the family Tegulidae.

References

 Güller M. & Zelaya D.G. (2014). A new generic placement for "Calliostoma" blakei Clench & Aguayo, 1938 (Gastropoda: Trochoidea). Malacologia. 57(2): 309-317

External links
 To Biodiversity Heritage Library (1 publication)
 To Encyclopedia of Life
 To World Register of Marine Species

Tegulidae
Gastropods described in 1938